Sanner may refer to:

38203 Sanner, Main-belt Asteroid
Felix J. Sanner (1867–1946), New York politician
Jan Tore Sanner, Norwegian politician